Katarina Lazović (born 12 September 1999) is a Serbian volleyball player, playing as wing spiker.

She had played for OK Vizura Belgrade before continuing an international career in Poland in 2019 for ŁKS Łódź. From 2021 she joined Italian club Pallavolo Monza.

She is a member of the Serbia women's national volleyball team. She participated at the 2019 Women's European Volleyball Championship and winning gold medal.

References

External links

 

1999 births
Living people
Serbian women's volleyball players
People from Belgrade
Expatriate volleyball players in Italy
Expatriate volleyball players in Poland
Serie A1 (women's volleyball) players
European champions for Serbia
Serbian expatriate sportspeople in Italy
Serbian expatriate sportspeople in Poland